Brian Doyle (born February 28, 1984 in Concord, California) is a former American rugby union player who last played for the San Diego Breakers and the United States national rugby union team. He played second row.

References

1984 births
Living people
American rugby union players
United States international rugby union players
Rugby union locks